David Smith (18 November 1861 – 24 January 1943) was an Australian politician.

Born at Sheepshead Gully near Bendigo to miner James Smith and Agnes Thompson, he attended schools in Bendigo before becoming a blacksmith, spending periods in Yarraville and Mirboo North. Around 1886 he married Agnes Elizabeth Reed, with whom he had two sons, Sydney and Leslie. In 1904 he was elected to the Victorian Legislative Assembly as the Labor member for Bendigo West. Appointed Minister without Portfolio in 1913, he was expelled from the Labor Party in 1914 after supporting the teaching of scripture lessons in state schools. In 1916 he joined the National Labor Party and was a Nationalist from 1917. Smith left the Assembly in 1924 and died in 1943.

References

|-

1861 births
1943 deaths
Nationalist Party of Australia members of the Parliament of Victoria
Members of the Victorian Legislative Assembly
Australian blacksmiths
Australian people of Scottish descent
People from Bendigo
Australian Labor Party members of the Parliament of Victoria